Mateusz Kowalczyk and Szymon Walków were the defending champions but chose to defend their title with different partners. Kowalczyk partnered Karol Drzewiecki but lost in the final to Andre Begemann and Florin Mergea. Walków partnered Marcin Matkowski but lost in the first round to Jeremy Jahn and Pedro Martínez.

Begemann and Mergea won the title after defeating Drzewiecki and Kowalczyk 6–1, 3–6, [10–8] in the final.

Seeds

Draw

References

External links
 Main draw

BNP Paribas Sopot Open - Doubles